Uiju Airfield  is an airport in Uiju County, Pyongan-bukto, North Korea.

Facilities 
The airfield has a single concrete runway 05/23 measuring 8180 x 174 feet (2493 x 53 m).  It is sited in the Yalu River plain, a few miles northeast of the Chinese city of Dandong.  It is also a few miles northeast of Sinuiju Airport.  It has a full-length parallel taxiway, and several taxiways that access dispersed aircraft stands.

Tenants
The airfield is home to the Korean People's Army Air Force's 24th Bomber Regiment, which has at least 32 Harbin B-5 (Ilyushin Il-28) bombers on site as of 2010.

In 2021 the airfield was converted to a cargo decontamination facility for containers brought in by freight trains from China.

References 

Airports in North Korea
North Pyongan